Colleen Moore (born Kathleen Morrison; August 19, 1899 – January 25, 1988) was an American film actress who began her career during the silent film era. Moore became one of the most fashionable (and highly-paid) stars of the era and helped popularize the bobbed haircut.

Although Moore was a huge star in her day, approximately half of her films are now considered lost, including her first talking picture from 1929. What was perhaps her most celebrated film, Flaming Youth (1923), is now mostly lost as well, with only one reel surviving.

Moore took a hiatus from acting between 1929 and 1933, just as sound was being added to motion pictures. After she returned, her four sound pictures released in 1933 and 1934 were not financial successes. She then retired permanently from screen acting.

After her film career, Moore maintained her wealth through astute investments, becoming a partner of Merrill Lynch. She later wrote a "how-to" book about investing in the stock market.

Moore also nurtured a passion for dollhouses throughout her life and helped design and curate The Colleen Moore Dollhouse, which has been a featured exhibit at the Museum of Science and Industry in Chicago since the early 1950s.

Early life
Moore was born Kathleen Morrison on August 19, 1899, (according to the bulk of the official records; the date which she insisted was correct in her autobiography, Silent Star, was 1902) in Port Huron, Michigan, Moore was the eldest child of Charles R. and Agnes Kelly Morrison. The family remained in Port Huron during the early years of Moore's life, at first living with her grandmother Mary Kelly (often spelled Kelley) and then with at least one of Moore's aunts.

By 1905, the family moved to Hillsdale, Michigan, where they remained for over two years. They relocated to Atlanta, Georgia, by 1908. They are listed at three different addresses during their stay in Atlanta (From the Atlanta-Fulton Public Library city directories): 301 Capitol Avenue − 1908; 41 Linden Avenue – 1909; 240 N. Jackson Street – 1910. They then lived briefly — probably for less than a year — in Warren, Pennsylvania, and by 1911, they had settled in Tampa, Florida.

At the age of 15 she took her first step into Hollywood. Her uncle arranged a screen test with director D. W. Griffith. She wanted to be a second Lillian Gish but instead, she found herself playing heroines in Westerns with stars such as Tom Mix.

Two of Moore's great passions were dolls and movies; each would play a great role in her later life. She and her brother began their own stock company, reputedly performing on a stage created from a piano packing crate. Her aunts, who doted on her, indulged her other great passion and often bought her miniature furniture on their many trips, with which she furnished the first of a succession of dollhouses. Moore's family summered in Chicago, where she enjoyed baseball and the company of her Aunt Lib (Elizabeth, who changed her name to "Liberty", Lib for short) and Lib's husband Walter Howey. Howey was the managing editor of the Chicago Examiner and an important newspaper editor in the publishing empire of William Randolph Hearst, and was the inspiration for Walter Burns, the fictional Chicago newspaper editor in the play and the film The Front Page.

Career

Early years
Essanay Studios was within walking distance of the Northwestern L, which ran right past the Howey residence. (They occupied at least two residences between 1910 and 1916: 4161 Sheridan and 4942 Sheridan.) In interviews later in her silent film career, Moore claimed she had appeared in the background of several Essanay films, usually as a face in a crowd. One story has it that she got into the Essanay studios and waited in line to be an extra with Helen Ferguson: in an interview with Kevin Brownlow many years later, Ferguson told a story that substantially confirmed many details of the claim, though it is not certain whether she was referring to Moore's stints as a background extra (if she really was one) or to her film test there prior to her departure for Hollywood in November 1917. Film producer D. W. Griffith was in debt to Howey, who had helped him to get both The Birth of a Nation and Intolerance through the Chicago censorship board.

The contract to Griffith's Triangle-Fine Arts was conditional on passing a film test to ensure that her heterochromia (she had one brown eye, one blue eye) would not be a distraction in close-up shots. Her eyes passed the test, so she left for Hollywood with her grandmother and her mother as chaperones. Moore made her first credited film appearance in 1917 in The Bad Boy for Triangle Fine Arts, and for the next few years appeared in small, supporting roles gradually attracting the attention of the public.

The Bad Boy was released on February 18, and featured Robert Harron, Richard Cummings, Josephine Crowell, and Mildred Harris (who would later become Charles Chaplin's first wife). Two months later, it was followed by An Old-Fashioned Young Man, again with Robert Harron. Moore’s third film was Hands Up! filmed in part in the vicinity of the Seven Oaks (a popular location for productions that required dramatic vistas). This was her first true western. The film’s scenario was written by Wilfred Lucas from a story by Al Jennings, the famous outlaw who had been freed from jail by presidential pardon by Theodore Roosevelt in 1907. Monte Blue was in the cast and noticed Moore could not mount her horse, though horseback riding was required for the part (during casting for the part she neglected to mention she did not know how to ride). Blue gave her a quick lesson essentially consisting of how to mount the horse and how to hold on.

On May 3, 1917, the Chicago Daily Tribune said: "Colleen Moore contributes some remarkable bits of acting. She is very sweet as she goes trustingly to her bandit hero, and, O, so pitiful, when finally realizing the character of the man, she goes into a hysteria of terror, and, shrieking 'Daddy, Daddy, Daddy!' beats futilely on a bolted door, a panic-stricken little human animal, who had not known before that there was aught but kindness in the world." About the time her first six-month contract was extended an additional six months, she requested and received five weeks' release to do a film for Universal's Bluebird division, released under the name The Savage. This was her fourth film, and she was only needed for two weeks. Upon her return to the Fine Arts lot, she spent several weeks trying to get her pay for the three weeks she had been available for work for Triangle (finally receiving it in December of that year).

Soon after, the Triangle Company went bust, and while her contract was honored, she found herself scrambling to find her next job. With a reel of her performance in Hands Up! under her arm, Colin Campbell arranged for her to get a contract with Selig Polyscope. She was very likely at work on A Hoosier Romance before The Savage was released in November. After A Hoosier Romance, she went to work on Little Orphant Annie. Both films were based upon poems by James Whitcomb Riley, and both proved to be very popular. It was her first real taste of popularity.

Little Orphant Annie was released in December. The Chicago Daily Tribune wrote of Moore, "She was a lovely and unspoiled child the last time I saw her. Let's hope commendation hasn't turned her head." Despite her good notices, her luck took a turn for the worse when Selig Polyscope went bust. Once again Moore found herself unemployed, but she had begun to make a name for herself by 1919. She had a series of films lined up. She went to Flagstaff, Arizona, for location work on The Wilderness Trail, another western, this time with Tom Mix. Her mother went along as a chaperone. Moore wrote that while she had a crush on Mix, he only had eyes for her mother. The Wilderness Trail was a Fox Film Corporation production, and while it had started production earlier, it would not be released until after The Busher, which was released on May 18. The Busher was an H. Ince Productions-Famous Players-Lasky production; it was a baseball film whose hero was played by John Gilbert. The Wilderness Trail followed on July 6, another Fox film. The Man in the Moonlight, a Universal Film Manufacturing Company film, was released a few weeks later on July 28. The Egg Crate Wallop was a Famous Players-Lasky production released by Paramount Pictures on September 28.

Success
The next stage of her career was with the Christie Film Company, a move she made when she decided she needed comic training. While with Christie she made Her Bridal Nightmare, A Roman Scandal, and So Long Letty. At the same time as she was working on these films, she worked on The Devil's Claim with Sessue Hayakawa (in which she played a Persian woman), When Dawn Came, and His Nibs (1921) with Chic Sale. All the while, Marshall Neilan had been attempting to get Moore released from her contract so she could work for him. He was successful and made Dinty with Moore, releasing near the end of 1920, followed by When Dawn Came.

For all his efforts to win Moore away from Christie, it seems Neilan loaned Moore to other studios most of the time. He loaned her out to King Vidor for The Sky Pilot, released in May 1921, yet another Western. After working on The Sky Pilot on location in the snows of Truckee, she was off to Catalina Island for work on The Lotus Eater with John Barrymore. In October 1921, His Nibs was released, her only film to be released that year besides The Sky Pilot. In His Nibs, Moore actually appeared in a film within the film; the framing film was a comedy vehicle for Chic Sales. The film it framed was a spoof on films of the time. 1922 proved to be an eventful year for Moore; she was named a WAMPAS Baby Star during a "frolic" at the Ambassador Hotel which became an annual event, in recognition of her growing popularity. In early 1922, Come On Over was released, made from a Rupert Hughes story and directed by Alfred E. Green. Hughes directed Moore himself in The Wallflower, released that same year. In addition, Neilan introduced her to John McCormick, a publicist who had had his eye on Moore ever since he had first seen her photograph. He had prodded Marshall into an introduction. The two hit it off, and before long they were engaged. By the end of that year, three more of her films were released: Forsaking All Others, The Ninety and Nine, and Broken Chains.

Look Your Best and The Nth Commandment were released in early 1923, followed by two Cosmopolitan Productions, The Nth Commandment and Through the Dark. By this time, Moore had publicly confirmed her engagement to McCormick, a fact that she had been coy about to the press previously. Before mid-year, she had signed a contract with First National Pictures, and her first two films were slated to be The Huntress and Flaming Youth. Slippy McGee came out in June, followed by Broken Hearts of Broadway.

Moore and John McCormick married while Flaming Youth was still in production, and just before the release of The Savage. When it was finally released in 1923, Flaming Youth, in which she starred opposite actor Milton Sills, was a hit. The controversial story put Moore in focus as a flapper, but after Clara Bow took the stage in Black Oxen in December, she gradually lost her momentum. In spring 1924 she made a good but unsuccessful effort to top Bow in The Perfect Flapper, and soon after she dismissed the whole flapper vogue; "No more flappers...people are tired of soda-pop love affairs." Decades later Moore stated Bow was her "chief rival."

Through the Dark, originally shot under the name Daughter of Mother McGinn, was released during the height of the Flaming Youth furor in January 1924. Three weeks later, Painted People was released. After that, she was to star in Counterfeit. The film went through a number of title changes before being released as Flirting with Love in August. In October, First National purchased the rights to Sally for Moore's next film. It would be a challenge, as Sally was a musical comedy. In December, First National purchased the rights to Desert Flower and in so doing had mapped out Moore's schedule for 1925: Sally would be filmed first, followed by The Desert Flower.

By the late 1920s, she had accomplished dramatic roles in films such as So Big, where Moore aged through a stretch of decades, and was also well received in light comedies such as Irene. An overseas tour was planned to coincide with the release of So Big in Europe, and Moore saw the tour as her first real opportunity to spend time with her husband, John McCormick. Both she and John McCormick were dedicated to their careers, and their hectic schedules had kept them from spending any quality time together. Moore wanted a family; it was one of her goals.

Plans for the trip were put in jeopardy when she injured her neck during the filming of The Desert Flower. Her injury forced the production to shut down while Moore spent six weeks in a body cast in bed. Once out of the cast, she completed the film and left for Europe on a triumphal tour. When she returned, she negotiated a new contract with First National. Her films had been great hits, so her terms were very generous. Her first film upon her return to the States was We Moderns, set in England with location work done in London during the tour. It was a comedy, essentially a retelling of Flaming Youth from an English perspective. This was followed by Irene (another musical in the style of the very popular Sally) and Ella Cinders, a straight comedy that featured a cameo appearance by comedian Harry Langdon. It Must Be Love was a romantic comedy with dramatic undertones, and it was followed by Twinkletoes, a dramatic film that featured Moore as a young dancer in London's Limehouse district during the previous century. Orchids and Ermine was released in 1927, filmed in part in New York, a thinly veiled Cinderella story.

In 1927, Moore split from her studio after her husband suddenly quit. It is rumored that John McCormick was about to be fired for his drinking and that she left as a means of leveraging her husband back into a position at First National. It worked, and McCormick found himself as Moore's sole producer. Moore's popularity allowed her productions to become very large and lavish. Lilac Time was one of the bigger productions of the era, a World War I drama. A million dollar film, it made back every penny spent within months. Prior to its release, Warner Bros. had taken control of First National and were less than interested in maintaining the terms of her contract until the numbers started to roll in for Lilac Time. The film was such a hit that Moore managed to retain generous terms in her next contract and her husband as her producer.

Colleen Moore Fairy Castle (Dollhouse)
In 1928, inspired by her father and with help from her former set designer, a dollhouse was constructed by her father, which was 9 square feet with the tallest tower 12 feet high. The interior of The Colleen Moore Dollhouse, designed by Harold Grieve, features miniature bear skin rugs and detailed furniture and art. Moore's dollhouse has been a featured exhibit at the Museum of Science and Industry in Chicago since October 30, 1949, where, according to the museum, it is seen by 1.5 million people each year and would be worth $7 million. Moore continued working on it and contributing artifacts to it until her death.

This dollhouse was the eighth one Moore owned. The first dollhouse, she wrote in her autobiography Silent Star (1968), evolved from a cabinet that held her collection of miniature furniture. It was supposedly built from a cigar box. Kitty Lorgnette wrote in the edition of The Evening News (Tampa, Florida) for Saturday, August 13, 1938, that the first dollhouse was purchased by Oraleze O'Brien (Mrs. Frank J. Knight) in 1916 when Moore (then Kathleen) left Tampa. Oraleze was too big for dollhouses, however, and she sold it again after her cat had kittens in it, and from there she lost track of it. The third house was possibly given to the daughter of Moore's good friend, author Adela Rogers St. Johns. The fourth survives and remains on display in the living room of a relative.

Sound films
With the advent of talking pictures in 1929, Moore took a hiatus from acting. After divorcing McCormick in 1930, Moore married prominent New York-based stockbroker Albert Parker Scott in 1932. The couple lived at that time in a lavish home at 345 St. Pierre Road in Bel Air, where they hosted parties for and were supporters of the U.S. Olympic team, especially the yachting team, during the 1932 Summer Olympics held in Los Angeles.

In 1934, Moore, by then divorced from Albert Parker Scott, returned to work in Hollywood. She appeared in three films, none of which was successful, and Moore retired. Her last film was a version of The Scarlet Letter in 1934. She later married the widower Homer Hargrave and raised his children (she never had children of her own) from a previous marriage, with whom she maintained a lifelong close relationship. Throughout her life she also maintained close friendships with other colleagues from the silent film era, such as King Vidor and Mary Pickford.

Later years

In the 1960s, Moore formed a television production company with King Vidor, with whom she had worked in the 1920s. She published two books in the late 1960s, How Women Can Make Money in the Stock Market (1969) and her autobiography, Silent Star: Colleen Moore Talks About Her Hollywood (1968). She also figures prominently alongside Vidor in Sidney D. Kirkpatrick's book, A Cast of Killers, which recounts Vidor's attempt to make a film of and solve the murder of William Desmond Taylor. In that book she is recalled as having been a successful real estate broker in Chicago and partner in the investment firm Merrill Lynch after her film career. 

At the height of her fame, Moore was earning $12,500 per week. She was an astute investor, and through her investments, remained wealthy for the rest of her life. In her later years she would frequently attend film festivals, and was a popular interview subject always willing to discuss her Hollywood career. She was a participant in the documentary series Hollywood (1980), providing her recollections of Hollywood's silent film era.

Personal life
Moore was married four times. Her first marriage was to John McCormick of First National Studios. They married in 1923 and divorced in 1930. In 1932, Moore married stockbroker Albert P. Scott. That union ended in divorce in 1934. Moore's third marriage was to Homer Hargrave, whom she married in 1936; he provided funding for her dollhouse and she adopted his son, Homer Hargrave, Jr and his daughter, Judy Hargrave. The couple remained married until Hargrave's death in 1964. Then, in 1982, she married builder Paul Magenot, and they remained together until Moore's death in 1988.

Death and legacy
On January 25, 1988, Moore died at age 88 from cancer in Paso Robles, California. For her contributions to the motion picture industry, Colleen Moore has a star on the Hollywood Walk of Fame at 1551 Vine Street.

F. Scott Fitzgerald wrote of her: "I was the spark that lit up Flaming Youth, Colleen Moore was the torch. What little things we are to have caused all that trouble."

Filmography

References

Bibliography
Jeanine Basinger, chapter on Moore in Silent Stars (: 1999)
Cedric Osmond Bermingham, Stars of the Screen, 1931: A Volume of Biographies of Contemporary Actors and Actresses Engaged in Photoplay Throughout the World (1931)
Jeff Codori, Colleen Moore; A Biography of the Silent Film Star, McFarland Publishing (print , ebook : 2012)
John Kobal, People Will Talk (1985)
Glenn Mitchell, A-Z of Silent Film Comedy, An Illustrated Companion (1998)
Colleen Moore, Silent Star: Colleen Moore Talks About Her Hollywood (1968)

External links

The Colleen Moore Project

1899 births
1988 deaths
20th-century American actresses
Actresses from Chicago
Actresses from Michigan
American autobiographers
American film actresses
American investors
American silent film actresses
Deaths from cancer in California
People from Paso Robles, California
People from Port Huron, Michigan
Women autobiographers
American women investors
Merrill (company) people
WAMPAS Baby Stars
20th-century American businesswomen
20th-century American businesspeople